Annasaheb M. K. Patil (born 15 September 1939) is an Indian politician with the Bharatiya Janata Party (BJP). He was a member of parliament in the 14th Lok Sabha of India (May 2004-Dec 2005), representing the Erandol constituency of Maharashtra. In the National Democratic Alliance (NDA) government (1999–2004), he was Minister of State for Rural Development.

Career
Patil is a consulting engineer and technologist by profession. Educated at Pune university and Louislana University USA, Patil is an MSC (chemical engineering) and ANSI, Sugar Technology from National Sugar Institute Kanpur Patil took to politics into 1990's and was elected to the lok sabha for the first time in 1996 as a BJP candidate. In that election Patil defeated Yaswant Patil of congress by a margin of 46,527 votes. In the 1998 elections, he defeated Vijay Patil of congress by a margin of 24,836 votes. In the 1999 Lok sabha elections, Patil defeated Vasantrao More of Nationalist Congress party by a margin of 1,04,456 votes. He was expelled from parliament on December 23, 2005, after the sting Operation Duryodhana. The expulsion is currently sub judice. During his earlier terms in Lok sabha, Patil had been a member of committee on Industry, coal and the committee on subordinate legislation. With his vast knowledge on science and Technology. Patil has contributed articles in various magazines and news papers on these subject. Among the offices he has held as chairman of Belganga cooperative sugar mills, Vice president All India Sugar Technology Associations. Director District cooperative Bank Jalgaon and member of Sugar Industry Development Council and Central council for cooperation. Widely traveled abroad Patil has visited Germany, Brazil, Italy, Nigeria, Switzerland, USA and UK.

Strategist
Patil is a chief strategist for BJP renewable energy cell and he has taken a lead role in formulating BJP Renewable energy policy in a pan Indian view Patil is holding respected positions in national and international renewable energy organizations, apart from these he is the current chairman of International Bio energy forum. Patil himself a pioneer and an expert in chemical engineering and a leader with a technological vision, His policies and wisdom helped BJP to co ordinate its renewable energy cell, BJP president himself satisfied with his work and offering him every support from the party. Currently he is in touch with all the BJP ruling states to expand and improve the solar energy production and investment in the field of solar energy.

His ideas and policies inspired energetic BJP leaders like Narendra Modi, Shiva Raj Singh Chauhan, Sushil Kumar Modi and other NDA ruling state leaders, He is widely acclaimed by all the leaders of India cutting across party line. Patil has a  bio energy vision, he urged the state governments to  start mixing ethanol with gasoline in an attempt to protect the nation's petroleum reserve. Due to Patil's efforts, the Karnataka government has started the process of blending ethanol with petrol, states like Gujarat, Madhya Pradesh, Punjab, Maharashtra and Chhattisgarh were also soon to follow the suit.

According to Patil's view, adding the 20% blending of ethanol with petrol not only adds tremendously to the petroleum preserve of the nation, it also contributed substantially to clean air in the environment. For the diesel-ignited engines, according to his opinion  diesel mixed with 25% of bio-diesel made from vegetable oil extracted from palas, mahua, and other seeds had immense impact on the petroleum reserve and the environment, while also utilizing more than four lakh hectares of waste, low-quality land currently not under cultivation. During the NDA regime his rural development policies were widely acclaimed by every one. Prime minister A B Vajpayee praised Patil's work and had given him every support from the government.

References

Living people
1939 births
Bharatiya Janata Party politicians from Maharashtra
People from Maharashtra
India MPs 2004–2009
Marathi politicians
India MPs 1999–2004
India MPs 1998–1999
India MPs 1996–1997
People from Jalgaon
People from Nashik
Lok Sabha members from Maharashtra